Todd Matthew Hazelwood (born 25 September 1995) is an Australian professional racing driver competing in the Repco Supercars Championship. He currently drives the #3 CoolDrive Racing Ford Mustang for Melbourne-based team, Blanchard Racing Team (BRT).

Todd is currently in his sixth season racing in the premier Australian motorsport category and has achieved both a podium finish and Pole Position during this time.

Hazelwood previously contested in the Dunlop Super2 Series, and won the championship with Matt Stone Racing in a Holden VF Commodore in 2017.

Hazelwood also won the prestigious Mike Kable Young Gun Award in 2014.

Racing career

Karting 

Todd started his racing career at the age of seven with his first event at the Adelaide Dirt Kart Club. Todd managed to progress quickly as a rookie in 2003 and instantly moved into the Juniors division at the age of 8. Todd went on to claim 2nd in his first ever Australian Title and went on to win 3x State Titles before making the switch to Bitumen Karts.

In 2008, Todd won his first race meeting on Bitumen and went on to achieve at the highest level around Australia. This included winning 5x Open State Titles, 4x Closed State Titles and 2x Pole Positions at Australian Titles. Todd also managed to win plenty of major karting events including the City of Melbourne and City of Adelaide Titles.

Formula Ford 

At the end of the 2010 season, Todd was selected from Arrow Racing Karts to test drive a Formula Ford at Winton Raceway. Along with many other karters, this was Todd's first time in a race car on an open circuit. After being very successful on his first test, Todd was then selected to drive a race meeting in the 2011 South Australian State Series Championships where Todd finished 2nd on debut. Todd and his family couldn't continue to fund the remaining rounds for 2011 and elected to start fundraise and save for the 2012 seaosn.

After a slim year of racing and lots of fundrasing, Todd was chosen to be the next Fujitsu 'Cool Driver' for the 2012 Victorian Formula Ford State Series. In a year that was super competitive with fields over 40+ at some events, Todd managed to finish 4th in the series with one of the oldest chassis/engine combinations in the field.

Formula 3 Australian Drivers Championship 

In 2013, Hazelwood made his debut in the Australian Formula 3 National Championship with R-Tek Motorsport in a Dallara F304. He raced the full season with the team and finished 2nd in the Championship standings in his rookie season.

Highlights include his first pole position and round win at Sydney Motorsport Park.

Super2 Series 

Todd Hazelwood started his Development Series career by winning the Shannons Supercar Showdown in 2013 with Supercars team Prodrive Racing Australia (then Ford Performance Racing). The team helped field a car for Hazelwood to race in the final round of the 2013 Dunlop V8 Supercar Series, with Minda Motorsport. Hazelwood came back in 2014 with Matt Stone Racing driving the iSeek backed Ford FG Falcon. Todd finished 8th overall, and was the highest placed rookie with four top 5 finishes and being awarded the V8 Supercars Mike Kable Young Gun Award.

In 2015 Hazelwood returned in the same car with Matt Stone Racing. Todd achieved his very first overall podium at the Sydney 500 and finished 4th overall in the series standings.

For 2016 Todd had a few changes over the offseason including changing to a Holden VF Commodore, with a Car of the Future (COTF) specification chassis. Todd finished in the top 3 four times throughout the season. He finished 3rd in the series and also won the Supercars Privateers Cup for the highest placed team/driver not affiliated with a main series team. 

In 2017 Hazelwood again drove a VF Holden Commodore from Matt Stone Racing supported by Bigmate. Todd consistently qualified and finished in the top 10 all year long. This included 14 front row starts, 13 podiums and 6 race wins. A total of three pole positions also helped Todd receive the Armor All Pole Position Award. With Todd's dominant and consistent results, Todd won the Dunlop Super2 Series Title by 95 points over Paul Dumbrell.

Supercars Championship

Wildcard entry and Endurance races (2017)

Hazelwood made his Supercars Championship debut with Matt Stone Racing as a wildcard entry at the 2017 Ipswich SuperSprint, finishing 22nd and 18th. He made his Enduro Cup debut driving with Tim Blanchard at the 2017 Sandown 500, though the car did not start the race after Hazelwood was involved in a major accident during the first qualifying race. The duo finished 12th at the Bathurst 1000 and 15th and 20th at the Gold Coast 600 to finish 22nd in the Enduro Cup.

Matt Stone Racing (2018–19 + 2022)

Hazelwood made his full-time debut in 2018, moving up with Matt Stone Racing with the team acquiring an ex-DJR Team Penske Ford Falcon FG X. The team and driver struggled with the adjustment, leading to a mid-season switch of chassis to the Holden VF Commodore used in Super2 in 2017 at The Bend SuperSprint. A trying season continued, and Hazelwood finished 26th in the championship with a best race finish of 13th at the Newcastle 500. He and Bryce Fullwood would finish in 20th and two laps down at the Bathurst 1000 after Fullwood spun into the sand-trap at Murrays' Corner on lap 94.

Hazelwood continued with Matt Stone Racing in 2019, with the team acquiring an ex-Jamie Whincup Holden ZB Commodore and a technical alliance with Triple Eight Race Engineering. Results immediately improved, with Hazelwood making his first Top 10 Shootout and achieving his first top 10 finish during the second race at the Adelaide 500. Hazelwood achieved a career best finish during the 2019 season, a 5th placing during the Pukekohe round. Hazelwood finished his final race with MSR on a high in a very strong 10th at the Newcastle 500. 

Todd famously returned to MSR in 2022 after a two-year absence with Brad Jones Racing. Racing in the #35 Truck Assist ZB Commodore, The start of the year was very promising which included multiple top five and top ten finishes. After being placed inside the Top Ten of the Championship standings after round #5, the back half of the season would take a turn for the worse as Todd and his team suffered from failures and unlucky racing incidents, tumbling down to 18th in the Championship standings.

Brad Jones Racing (2020-2021)
Hazelwood confirmed his move from Matt Stone Racing to Brad Jones Racing in November 2019, replacing Tim Slade who left to join Scott McLaughlin and DJR Team Penske in a co-driver role. 

2020 proved to be a breakthrough season for Hazelwood with the 24 year old achieving his maiden podium finish with a 3rd at Sydney Motorsport Park and maiden Pole Position at Townsville. The year produced many highlights, including fighting for a race wins at Sydney and Townsville. The year did come with some battles as Hazelwood suffered from a number of setbacks hurting the overall Championship finish ending 17th in the points.

BJR re-signed Todd for 2021 and will start the season opener at the Bathurst 500 in the #14 Dunlop Super Dealer Racing livery.
He then raced at the Sandown SuperSprint in the #14 Cub Cadet Mowers Racing livery.
For Bathurst 1000, he drove with Dean Fiore where they finished 8th, being a personal best Bathurst 1000 result for Hazelwood. Todd managed to achieve 12x Top Ten Race results along with 4x Top Five results, finishing the season in 13th.

Blanchard Racing Team (2023-Current)
Todd is currently racing for Melbourne-based Supercars team, Blanchard Racing Team in the #3 CoolDrive Auto Parts Ford Mustang. 2023 has already been an exciting year for Todd being the first team and driver to prepare and run a new specification GEN3 Supercar. This season will be Todd's sixth season in the Supercars Championship and the family owned and operated team have big ambitions with Todd this season ahead.

Career results

Super2 Series results
(key) (Round results only)

Supercars Championship results

Bathurst 1000 results

References

External links
 
 Todd Hazelwood profile at Racing Reference
 

Australian racing drivers
Living people
Supercars Championship drivers
1995 births
Matt Stone Racing drivers